Siegfried Theiß (17 November 1882 – 24 January 1963) was an Austrian architect. His work was part of the architecture event in the art competition at the 1948 Summer Olympics.

References

1882 births
1963 deaths
20th-century Austrian architects
Olympic competitors in art competitions
Architects from Bratislava
Nazi Party members